Ebenezer Sage (August 16, 1755 – January 20, 1834) was a United States representative from New York.

Early life
Sage was born in that part of the town of Chatham (which was later separated as the Town of Portland) in the Connecticut Colony. He was a son of David Sage, the first representative from Chatham to the General Assembly, serving from 1768 to 1775.

He received his early education from a private tutor and graduated from Yale College in 1778, the same class as Joel Barlow and Noah Webster. He studied medicine, and commenced practice in Easthampton, Suffolk County, New York, in 1784.

Career
After practicing medicine in Easthampton for many years, he moved to Sag Harbor about 1801.

Sage was elected as a Democratic-Republican to the 11th, 12th and 13th United States Congresses, holding office from March 4, 1809, to March 3, 1815. In the election for the 16th United States Congress Sage appeared to win, but only because votes for his opponent, James Guyon, Jr., were split between James Guyon, Jr. and James Guyon. Credentials of his election to Congress were issued by the Secretary of State of New York but Sage did not claim or take the seat. Guyon successfully contested Sage's election and was seated on January 14, 1820.

Later life
Sage resumed the practice of medicine at Sag Harbor and was a delegate to the New York State Constitutional Convention of 1821.

Death
Sage died at Sag Harbor, Suffolk County, N.Y., January 20, 1834, at the age of 78. He was later buried at the Old Burying Ground.

Personal life
Sage was married to Ruth Smith (1764–1831), a daughter of Ruth (née Howell) Smith and Dr. William "Bull" Smith of Southampton, a descendant of settler Richard Smith. Together, they were the parents of Frances Mary "Fanny" Sage (who married Dr. Lawton and settled in Mobile, Alabama) and John Smith Sage (1781–1882), who also became a doctor.

References

External links

1755 births
1834 deaths
People from Portland, Connecticut
Yale College alumni
Politicians from Suffolk County, New York
People from East Hampton (town), New York
Physicians from New York (state)
Democratic-Republican Party members of the United States House of Representatives from New York (state)
Burials in New York (state)
People from Sag Harbor, New York